Goedecke is a German language surname from the personal name Gottfried. Notable people with the name include:
 Friedrich Wilhelm von Goedecke (1771–1857), German soldier and politician in Dutch-Luxembourg service
 Wolfgang Goedecke (1906–1942), German rower

References 

German-language surnames
Surnames from given names